Liotyphlops argaleus is a species of snakes in the family Anomalepididae. It is endemic to Colombia.

References

Anomalepididae
Reptiles of Colombia
Reptiles described in 1984